Batting gloves are a component in bat-and-ball games sportswear. Typically consisting of a leather palm and back made of nylon or another synthetic fabric, the glove covers one or both hands of a batter, providing comfort, prevention of blisters, warmth, improved grip, and shock absorption when hitting the ball. Batting gloves are considered an essential part of cricket equipment, though they are not mandatory at any level of the game.

Purpose

The majority of professional and high-level amateur baseball players wear batting gloves. They are worn because they help increase the quality of the grip on the bat. Maintaining a tight and controlled grip is essential to successful hits. Even the slightest slip or variation in grip can cost the team greatly. They also act as a protector of the hand when one slides into a base. Another prime use for batting gloves, especially in amateur leagues that permit aluminum bats, is shock protection. On a cold day, a swing can fracture fingers.

History in baseball

During the 1932 Brooklyn Dodgers season, Lefty O'Doul and Johnny Frederick began experimenting with accessories as "shock absorbers" to combat hand injuries. O'Doul wore "an ordinary street glove" to the plate during games while Frederick bandaged his hands "with the same sort of material that is used to stuff shoulder pads worn by football players." The Sporting News reported, however, that O'Doul was expected to stop using the glove as soon as his hand was back to full health.

Some claim the first player to wear a batting glove was Bobby Thomson of the Giants, who wore golf gloves during spring training in 1949. Ken "Hawk" Harrelson has been credited with being the first player to wear a batting glove in an actual game (as opposed to usage during batting practice).

In 2013, an hour-long documentary, called “Hawk: The Colorful life of Ken Harrelson,” began airing on the MLB Network. At roughly the 22-minute mark of the presentation, Ken describes his involvement in the origin of the batting glove (although he calls it the "hitting" glove in the documentary). Ken does not state the year, but describes that in his first two years in the big leagues, he made more money playing golf, shooting pool, and armwrestling than he did playing major league baseball, and goes right into a story. Ken describes, after playing 27 holes of golf with fellow players, Ted Bowsfield, Gino Cimoli, and Sammy Esposito, he went straight to the ballpark for a game against the Yankees, whereby he developed a blister on his left hand during batting practice. He goes on to say that he remembered he had his golf glove in the pocket of his jeans and that he went to bat wearing the "flaming red golf glove" in the 1st inning to face Whitey [Ford]. He claims that in that 1st-inning at bat, Whitey hung him curveball that he hit it "450 feet" for a home run over the left-center wall. He goes on to say that in about the 6th inning, Whitey hung him another curveball and he hit that one about "480 feet". He concludes the story by saying the next day, all of the Yankees came out of their clubhouse with flaming red golf gloves on, as Ken stated that Mickey [Mantle] had the "clubby (clubhouse attendant) go out and purchase them. Harrelson laughs and states, "and that's how the hitting glove got started.”

See also

Golf gloves
Baseball clothing and equipment
Cricket clothing and equipment

References

External links

Baseball equipment
Cricket equipment
Sports gloves